Henry MacGregor Woods (November 4, 1896 – January 14, 1970) was a Tin Pan Alley songwriter and pianist,  he was a composer of numerous film scores.

Early life
Woods was born in North Chelmsford, Massachusetts. Despite the fact that he was born with a deformed left hand  (which still had fingers), Woods' mother, a concert singer, encouraged him to play the piano.

Woods earned his bachelor's degree at Harvard University, supporting himself by singing in church choirs and giving piano recitals.

Career
After graduation, he settled in Cape Cod and began life as a farmer. Woods was drafted into the army during World War I, and that is when he began cultivating his talent for songwriting. After his discharge, Woods settled in New York City and began his career as a songwriter.

Woods's first songwriting success came in 1923 with the song "I'm Goin' South", written with Abner Silver. It became a hit song in 1924 for Al Jolson. The same year, "Paddlin' Madelin Home" was published, with words and music by Woods.

By 1926, Woods was an established songwriter on Tin Pan Alley and would become legendary with his new song "When the Red, Red Robin (Comes Bob, Bob, Bobbin' Along)". The song was an instant hit for singers such as "Whispering" Jack Smith and Cliff Edwards. It was Al Jolson, though, who had the most success with his recording of the song. The song was recorded in 1953 by Doris Day and again achieved considerable success on the charts.

In 1929, Woods began contributing songs to Hollywood musicals such as The Vagabond Lover, A Lady's Morals, Artistic Temper, Aunt Sally, Twentieth Century, Road House, Limelight, It's Love Again, Merry Go Round of 1938, and She's For Me. In 1934, he moved to London, where he lived for three years and worked for the British film studio Gaumont British, contributing to the films Jack Ahoy and Evergreen.

While Woods usually wrote both words and music for his songs, he also collaborated with Mort Dixon, Al Sherman, Howard Johnson, Arthur Freed, Rube Bloom and Gus Kahn. Alone, or with his collaborators, he wrote "I'm Looking Over a Four Leaf Clover", "I'm Goin' South", "The Clouds Will Soon Roll By", "Just a Butterfly that’s Caught in the Rain", "Side by Side", "My Old Man", "A Little Kiss Each Morning", "Heigh-Ho, Everybody, Heigh-Ho", "Man From the South", "River Stay 'way from My Door", "When the Moon Comes Over the Mountain", "We Just Couldn’t Say Goodbye", "Just an Echo in the Valley", "A Little Street Where Old Friends Meet", "You Ought to See Sally on Sunday", "Hustlin' and Bustlin' for Baby", "What a Little Moonlight Can Do", "Try a Little Tenderness", "I'll Never Say 'Never Again' Again", "Over My Shoulder", "Tinkle Tinkle Tinkle", "When You've Got a Little Springtime in Your Heart", "Midnight, the Stars and You", and "I Nearly Let Love Go Slipping Through My Fingers".

Personal life and demise
He and his wife Barbara had three sons: Ralph, John and David. Woods was known for his temper and his drinking.

Around 1945, Woods retired. He and his wife relocated to Phoenix, Arizona. He died the night of January 14, 1970, after being struck by a car outside his house.

Selected filmography

References

External links

 Harry Woods recordings at the Discography of American Historical Recordings.

1896 births
1970 deaths
Songwriters from Massachusetts
American lyricists
American film score composers
American male film score composers
Harvard University alumni
People from Chelmsford, Massachusetts
People from Glendale, Arizona
American people with disabilities
Songwriters from Arizona
20th-century American composers
20th-century American male musicians
American male songwriters